Saxifraga rotundifolia, common name round-leaved saxifrage, is a flowering herb and alpine plant of the genus Saxifraga.

Subspecies
 Saxifraga rotundifolia subsp. heucherifolia (Grisebach & Schrenk.) Ciocarlan 
 Saxifraga rotundifolia subsp. rotundifolia

Description
This perennial herbaceous plant has fleshy leaves arranged in dense basal rosette. They are petiolate (up to 10 cm), up to 5 cm across, dark green, hairy, simple, rounded or almost heart-shaped, bordered by numerous triangular notches. The flowering stems are erect, pubescent, branched at the top, bearing narrow panicles of star-shaped flowers. These flowers have five lanceolate petals, usually white with numerous minute pink-purple specks. They bloom from April to August.

Distribution
This species is present in the central and southern Europe in the Iberian Peninsula, the Alps and the Balkans.

Habitat

References

Biolib
Alpine Plant Encyclopaedia
Acta Plantarum

rotundifolia
Flora of Europe
Plants described in 1753
Taxa named by Carl Linnaeus